State Route 218 (SR 218) is a state highway in the U.S. state of California, connecting State Route 1 with State Route 68 in Monterey County. SR 218 takes an approach north of Monterey Regional Airport via the cities of Seaside and Del Rey Oaks.

Route description
The route begins at State Route 1 in Seaside as a 3 to 4-lane city street for about 3/4 mile. It then exits the city and enters Del Rey Oaks as a 2-lane highway where it shortly meets its east end at California State Route 68.

SR 218 is not part of the National Highway System, a network of highways that are considered essential to the country's economy, defense, and mobility by the Federal Highway Administration.

Major intersections

See also

References

External links

California @ AARoads.com - State Route 218
Caltrans: Route 218 highway conditions
California Highways: SR 218

218
State Route 218